This page list topics related to Kuwait.



0-9
1983 Kuwait bombings

A
Andalous
Abdullah Al Mansour
Abdullah Al-Salem
Adiliya
Agriculture in Kuwait
Ahmad al-Jaber Air Base
Al Rai
Ali Al Salem Air Base
Amiri Diwan of Kuwait
Architecture of Kuwait
Areas of Kuwait
Armenians in Kuwait
Art of Kuwait
Al Hamra Tower

B
Battle of Dasman Palace
Bubiyan Island
Burgan Bank
Bneid Al-Gar
Bayan
Bayan Palace

C
Cabinet of Kuwait
Central Bank of Kuwait
Christianity in Kuwait
Coat of arms of Kuwait
Coeducation in Kuwait
Commercial Bank of Kuwait
Constitution of Kuwait
Co-op Society
Corruption in Kuwait
COVID-19 pandemic in Kuwait
Crime in Kuwait
Culture of Kuwait

D
Dasma
Demographics of Kuwait

E
Economy of Kuwait
Elections in Kuwait
Electoral districts of Kuwait
Emblem of Kuwait
Emir of Kuwait
Energy in Kuwait
Environmental issues in Kuwait
Expatriates in Kuwait

F
Failaka Island
Faylaka Island attack
Farwaniya
Flag of Kuwait
Football in Kuwait
Foreign relations of Kuwait
Freedom of religion in Kuwait

G
Gate of Kuwait
Geography of Kuwait
Geology of Kuwait
Government of Kuwait
Governorates of Kuwait
Grand Mosque
Granada (Kuwait)
Green Island
Gulf Bank of Kuwait
Gulf Cooperation Council
Gulf Road

H
Health in Kuwait
Healthcare in Kuwait
Historical, Vintage, and Classical Cars Museum
History of Kuwait
History of the Jews in Kuwait
Human rights in Kuwait

I
Invasion of Kuwait
Islam in Kuwait
ISO 3166 standard for Kuwait

J
Jleeb Al-Shuyoukh
Jazeera Airways

K
Kuwait
Kuwait Air Force
Kuwait Airways
Kuwait Bay
Kuwait Army
Kuwait City
Kuwait Cricket Association
Kuwait Crown Prince Cup
Kuwaiti dinar
Kuwait Emir Cup
 Kuwait Flour Mills & Bakeries Company
Kuwait Football Association
Kuwait Fund for Arab Economic Development
Kuwait International Airport
Kuwait Investment Authority
Kuwait-Iraq barrier
Kuwait National Guard
Kuwait National Petroleum
Kuwait News Agency
Kuwait Oil Co.
Kuwait Petroleum Corporation
Kuwait Stock Exchange
Kuwait Scientific Center
Kuwait Times
Kuwait Telecommunications Tower
Kuwait Television
Kuwait Towers
Kuwait Water Towers
Kuwait University
Kuwaiti Arabic
Kuwaiti cuisine
Kuwaiti dinar
Khaitan
Kubbar Island

L
Languages of Kuwait
Legal system of Kuwait
LGBT rights in Kuwait (Gay rights)
Literature of Kuwait

M
Military of Kuwait
Ministry of Awqaf & Islamic Affairs
Ministry of Commerce & Industry
Ministry of Defense
Ministry of Electricity, Water and Renewable Energy
Ministry of Finance
Ministry of Foreign Affairs
Ministry of Interior
Music of Kuwait

N
National Anthem of Kuwait
National Assembly of Kuwait
National Bank of Kuwait

O
Oil industry of Kuwait
Oil reserves in Kuwait
Order of Kuwait

P
Politics of Kuwait
Political issues in Kuwait
Postage stamps and postal history of Kuwait
Public holidays in Kuwait
Prostitution in Kuwait

Q
Qurain Cultural Festival

R
Religion in Kuwait
Riggae
Roads in Kuwait

S
Sheikhdom of Kuwait
Souk Al-Manakh stock market crash
Sport in Kuwait
Square Capital Tower
Sabah Al-Ahmad Sea City
Salmiya
Shuwaikh
Sulaibiya

T
Telecommunications in Kuwait
Telephone numbers in Kuwait
Television in Kuwait
Terrorism in Kuwait
Time in Kuwait
Timeline of Kuwait City
Transport in Kuwait

U
Umm al Maradim Island
Umm an Namil Island

V
Vehicle registration plates of Kuwait
Visa policy of Kuwait
Visa requirements for Kuwaiti citizens

W
Women in Kuwait
Women's suffrage in Kuwait

X
Xcite

Y
Yarmouk
Youth Association of Kuwait

Z
Al Zour Refinery

Lists
List of airlines of Kuwait
List of airports in Kuwait
List of banks in Kuwait
List of companies of Kuwait
List of hospitals in Kuwait
List of islands of Kuwait
List of shopping malls in Kuwait
List of mosques in Kuwait
List of museums in Kuwait
List of newspapers in Kuwait
List of political parties in Kuwait
List of prime ministers of Kuwait
List of schools in Kuwait
List of speakers of Kuwait National Assembly
List of tallest buildings in Kuwait
List of universities in Kuwait

See also
Lists of country-related topics - similar lists for other countries

Templates

Kuwait